Deconica inquilina is a species of mushroom in the family Strophariaceae.  Formerly a member of the genus Psilocybe (well known for its psilocybin containing members), this species belonged to the non-blueing (non-hallucinogenic) clade and was consequently moved to Deconica in 2009.

Habitat and distribution
Deconica inquilina is found growing on decaying grass.  It is very widely distributed, reported from North America, South America and Europe.

References

Strophariaceae